Thanbauk may refer to:

 Thanbauk (poetic form)
Thanbauk, Mingin, Burma